"Children of the Corn" is a short story by Stephen King, first published in the March 1977 issue of Penthouse, and later collected in King's 1978 collection Night Shift. The story is about a couple who end up in an abandoned Nebraska town that is inhabited by a cult of murderous children who worship a demon that lives in the local cornfields. The story has been adapted into several films, spawning a horror feature film franchise of the same name beginning in 1984. In 2009, the story was included in the book Stephen King Goes to the Movies.

Plot
Burt and Vicky, a couple trying to save their marriage, are driving to California for a vacation and to visit Vicky's brother. As they are driving through rural Nebraska and arguing, Burt is ready to call off the vacation and consult a divorce attorney. Then they accidentally run over a young boy who had his throat slit and was thrown into the road. Burt opens the boy's suitcase to find a crucifix made of twisted corn husks. They agree to report the incident to the police, place the body in their car's trunk, and go to the nearest town—a small, isolated community called Gatlin—for help.

When they arrive in Gatlin, it appears to be deserted. They do not see any cars or people anywhere. After driving past a gas station and visiting a diner, they notice that several things (such as gas prices, menu prices, and calendar dates) are very outdated. Vicky, who does not like the town, starts to get nervous and asks if they can leave.

Burt decides to explore a nearby church he remembers seeing not too long ago. Vicky is unsure of his choice and tells him not to go. The couple argues as usual and Burt takes the keys and proceeds inside the church, which unlike the rest of the town, still shows signs of life.

Inside, he finds vile writings and artwork on the church wall as well as the keys and stops of the pipe organ ripped out and its pipes stuffed with corn husks. At the altar, Burt finds a King James Bible (with several pages from the New Testament cut out) as well as a record book listing the births and deaths of various people. He notices that all names in the book and another subsequent one were changed from modern to Biblical ones, and that everyone listed as deceased died on their 19th birthday. Burt realizes that 12 years ago, the children of Gatlin killed the town's adults and that members of their community are not allowed to live past their 19th birthday.

After hearing the car's horn, Burt runs from the church to find the car surrounded by a gang of children and teenagers dressed in Amish-style clothing and armed with farm tools. They destroy the windows and windshield, slash the tires, and drag Vicky out. Burt tries to intervene, but a redheaded teen boy stabs him in the arm. Burt pulls the knife out and stabs the boy in the throat. The children step back in shock. Burt then realizes that Vicky is gone. When he asks where she is, one of the children holds up a knife and makes a slashing motion.

The children chase Burt, but he manages to outrun them and ducks into the cornfield and hides while they search for him. He notices that there are no animals or weeds in the cornfield and that every stalk of corn is blemish-free. As the sun sets, Burt gets lost and wanders around until he finds a circle of empty ground in the middle of the cornfield and discovers Vicky's body. She has been tied to a cross with barbed wire and her eyes have been ripped out, her eye sockets filled with corn silk, and her mouth stuffed with corn husks. He also sees the crucified skeletons of Gatlin's minister and police chief; the latter is wearing a blue uniform. When Burt turns around to flee, he notices that every row in the cornfield has closed up, creating a wall that prevents him from escaping. He realizes that something is coming for him, but before he can do anything, he is killed by a giant, green, red-eyed monster that comes out of the cornfield. Soon after, a harvest moon appears in the sky.

The next day, the children of Gatlin (all of whom worship "He Who Walks Behind the Rows", an entity that inhabits the cornfields surrounding the town) have a meeting in the circle. Isaac, their 9-year-old leader, tells them that He Who Walks Behind the Rows is displeased with their sacrifice because they failed to also kill Burt. The same thing happened with the "blue man" and the "false minister" many years ago. He Who Walks Behind the Rows punishes this failure by lowering the "age of favor" to 18. He also commands the children to "be fruitful and multiply".

That night, Malachi (the killer of the boy who was run over) and all of the other 18-year-olds walk into the cornfield to sacrifice themselves to He Who Walks Behind the Rows. Ruth, a girl who is pregnant with Malachi's child, weeps as she waves goodbye to him. It is revealed that she secretly hates He Who Walks Behind the Rows and dreams of setting fire to the cornfield, but is afraid to actually do so because He Who Walks Behind the Rows can see everything, including the secrets inside human hearts. The story ends by saying that the corn surrounding Gatlin is pleased.

Connections to other books
Gatlin was mentioned in It. Hemingford Home, a neighboring town to Gatlin, was also the town where Mother Abagail lived and rounded up the good survivors of the super flu in The Stand, and was also the location in 1922.

Film series and adaptations

The story was first adapted into a 1983 short film, Disciples of the Crow.

A year later, the story was adapted into a larger-budget film re-adopting the original name, Children of the Corn, starring Peter Horton and Linda Hamilton. Several sequels, a prequel, remake and adaptation followed.

In September 2009, the Syfy channel premiered a television film version which is based on King's short story.

Film series
 Children of the Corn (1984)
 Children of the Corn II: The Final Sacrifice (1992)
 Children of the Corn III: Urban Harvest (1995)
 Children of the Corn IV: The Gathering (1996)
 Children of the Corn V: Fields of Terror (1998)
 Children of the Corn 666: Isaac's Return (1999)
 Children of the Corn: Revelation (2001)
 Children of the Corn (2009)
 Children of the Corn: Genesis (2011)
 Children of the Corn: Runaway (2018)
 Children of the Corn (2020)

Adaptations
 Children of the Corn (2020)

See also
 List of Stephen King films
 Short fiction by Stephen King

References

External links
 
 

 
1977 short stories
Horror short stories
Nebraska in fiction
Short stories by Stephen King
Works originally published in Penthouse (magazine)
Short stories adapted into films